The 1998–99 NBA season was the Lakers' 51st season in the National Basketball Association, and 39th in the city of Los Angeles. On March 23, 1998, the owners of all 29 NBA teams voted 27–2 to reopen the league's collective bargaining agreement, seeking changes to the league's salary cap system, and a ceiling on individual player salaries. The National Basketball Players Association (NBPA) opposed to the owners' plan, and wanted raises for players who earned the league's minimum salary. After both sides failed to reach an agreement, the owners called for a lockout, which began on July 1, 1998, putting a hold on all team trades, free agent signings and training camp workouts, and cancelling many NBA regular season and preseason games. Due to the lockout, the NBA All-Star Game, which was scheduled to be played in Philadelphia on February 14, 1999, was also cancelled. However, on January 6, 1999, NBA commissioner David Stern, and NBPA director Billy Hunter finally reached an agreement to end the lockout. The deal was approved by both the players and owners, and was signed on January 20, ending the lockout after 204 days. The regular season began on February 5, and was cut short to just 50 games instead of the regular 82-game schedule.

This season was also the Lakers' final season playing at the Great Western Forum. During the off-season, the team signed free agent Derek Harper, and re-acquired former Lakers center Travis Knight after one season with the Boston Celtics. The Lakers played around .500 with a 6–6 start as head coach Del Harris was fired. After one game under interim Bill Bertka, the team hired former Laker Kurt Rambis as their new coach. The Lakers had signed free agent and rebounding specialist Dennis Rodman, who was well known for winning championships with the Detroit Pistons and the Chicago Bulls. However, after 23 games, Rodman was released by the team, averaging 11.2 rebounds per game.

At midseason, Eddie Jones and Elden Campbell were both traded to the Charlotte Hornets in exchange for All-Star forward Glen Rice, J.R. Reid and B. J. Armstrong, who was released to free agency and signed with the Orlando Magic. The team also released Corie Blount, as he later on signed with the Cleveland Cavaliers. The Lakers won ten straight games between February and March, and finished second in the Pacific Division with a 31–19 record. Their home-game attendance for the season was 430,007 (12th in the league).

Kobe Bryant averaged 19.9 points, 5.3 rebounds and 1.4 steals per game in his first season as a starter, and was selected to the All-NBA Third Team, while Shaquille O'Neal averaged 26.3 points, 10.7 rebounds and 1.7 blocks per game, made the All-NBA Second Team, and finished in sixth place in Most Valuable Player voting. In addition, Rice played in 27 games due to an elbow injury he sustained in Charlotte, and provided the team with 17.5 points per game, while Rick Fox contributed 9.0 points per game off the bench, Harper provided with 6.9 points and 4.2 assists per game, and Derek Fisher contributed 5.9 points, 3.9 assists and 1.2 steals per game.

In the playoffs, the Lakers defeated the Houston Rockets 3–1 in the Western Conference First Round, but were swept in four straight games by the eventual champion San Antonio Spurs during the Western Conference Semi-finals. The Spurs would reach the NBA Finals for the first time to defeat the 8th-seeded New York Knicks in five games, winning their first ever championship.

Following the season, Rambis was fired as head coach, while Reid signed as a free agent with the Milwaukee Bucks, Sean Rooks was traded back to his former team, the Dallas Mavericks, rookie forward Ruben Patterson signed with the Seattle SuperSonics, and Harper was dealt to the Detroit Pistons, but was released and then retired.

Draft picks

Roster

Roster Notes
 Power forward Dennis Rodman was waived on April 16.

Regular season
The Lakers went through three coaches during the season: Del Harris (6–6), Bill Bertka (1–0) and Kurt Rambis (24–13). Fourteen different Lakers started at least one game during the season. From February 25 to March 12, the Lakers won ten consecutive games. Outside of the streak, the Lakers were 21–19 in all other games. During the season, over half of the Lakers' games were televised nationally.

At season's end, the Lakers ranked second in the league in scoring at 99.0 points per game (only Sacramento averaged more points: 100.2 ppg). Despite the high scoring, the Lakers were the fourth worst Free Throw shooting team in the league with a percentage of .683. Shaquille O'Neal had a percentage of .540. Following the season, Rambis was fired as coach.

Season standings

z – clinched division title
y – clinched division title
x – clinched playoff spot

Record vs. opponents

Game log

Regular season

|- style="background:#cfc;"
| 1
| February 5
| Houston
| W 99-91
| Shaquille O'Neal (30)
| Shaquille O'Neal (14)
| Derek Harper (7)
| Great Western Forum17,505
| 1-0
|- style="background:#fcc;"
| 2
| February 7
| Utah
| L 91-100
| Shaquille O'Neal (37)
| Shaquille O'Neal (14)
| Derek Harper (6)
| Great Western Forum17,505
| 1-1
|- style="background:#cfc;"
| 3
| February 8
| @ San Antonio
| W 80-75
| Shaquille O'Neal (26)
| Shaquille O'Neal (13)
| Robert Horry (4)
| Alamodome33,788
| 2-1
|- style="background:#cfc;"
| 4
| February 10
| @ Denver
| W 103-98
| Shaquille O'Neal (29)
| Kobe Bryant (10)
| 3 players tied (5)
| McNichols Sports Arena13,210
| 3-1
|- style="background:#fcc;"
| 5
| February 11
| @ Minnesota
| L 75-86
| Kobe Bryant (24)
| Kobe Bryant (10)
| Derek Harper (5)
| Target Center19,006
| 3-2
|- style="background:#fcc;"
| 6
| February 14
| Indiana
| L 99-101
| Shaquille O'Neal (36)
| Shaquille O'Neal (17)
| Derek Fisher (8)
| Great Western Forum17,505
| 3-3
|- style="background:#cfc;"
| 7
| February 16
| Charlotte
| W 116-88
| Fox & O'Neal (20)
| Shaquille O'Neal (12)
| 4 players tied (5)
| Staples Center14,093
| 4-3
|- style="background:#cfc;"
| 8
| February 17
| Dallas
| W 101-88
| Shaquille O'Neal (24)
| Shaquille O'Neal (12)
| Derek Fisher (6)
| Great Western Forum13,492
| 5-3
|- style="background:#cfc;"
| 9
| February 19
| San Antonio
| W 106-94
| Shaquille O'Neal (28)
| Shaquille O'Neal (10)
| Bryant & Harper (6)
| Great Western Forum17,505
| 6-3
|- style="background:#fcc;"
| 10
| February 21
| @ Seattle
| L 89-92
| Shaquille O'Neal (27)
| Kobe Bryant (13)
| Derek Harper (5)
| KeyArena17,072
| 6-4
|- style="background:#fcc;"
| 11
| February 22
| @ Denver
| L 113-117 (OT)
| Shaquille O'Neal (28)
| Kobe Bryant (13)
| Kobe Bryant (9)
| McNichols Sports Arena17,171
| 6-5
|- style="background:#fcc;"
| 12
| February 23
| @ Vancouver
| L 83-93
| Shaquille O'Neal (26)
| Shaquille O'Neal (10)
| Shaquille O'Neal (7)
| General Motors Place19,193
| 6-6
|- style="background:#cfc;"
| 13
| February 25
| @ L.A. Clippers
| W 115-100
| Shaquille O'Neal (19)
| Shaquille O'Neal (11)
| Bryant & Fisher (6)
| Arrowhead Pond18,456
| 7-6
|- style="background:#cfc;"
| 14
| February 26
| L.A. Clippers
| W 99-83
| Kobe Bryant (22)
| Dennis Rodman (11)
| Fisher & Rodman (6)
| Great Western Forum17,505
| 8-6
|- style="background:#cfc;"
| 15
| February 28
| Houston
| W 106-90
| Shaquille O'Neal (22)
| Dennis Rodman (10)
| Bryant & Fisher (3)
| Great Western Forum17,505
| 9-6

|- style="background:#cfc;"
| 16
| March 1
| @ Phoenix
| W 97-91
| Shaquille O'Neal (25)
| Dennis Rodman (16)
| Fox & Jones (5)
| American West Arena19,023
| 10-6
|- style="background:#cfc;"
| 17
| March 3
| Phoenix
| W 101-95
| Kobe Bryant (32)
| Dennis Rodman (17)
| Bryant & Fisher (5)
| Great Western Forum17,505
| 11-6
|- style="background:#cfc;"
| 18
| March 5
| Seattle
| W 103-100
| Shaquille O'Neal (31)
| Knight & O'Neal (11)
| Shaquille O'Neal (7)
| Great Western Forum17,505
| 12-6
|- style="background:#cfc;"
| 19
| March 7
| @ Utah
| W 97-89
| Kobe Bryant (24)
| Shaquille O'Neal (16)
| Harper & Jones (4)
| Delta Center19,911
| 13-6
|- style="background:#cfc;"
| 20
| March 9
| @ L.A. Clippers
| W 103-99
| Shaquille O'Neal (31)
| Dennis Rodman (20)
| Kobe Bryant (5)
| Los Angeles Memorial Sports Arena13,380
| 14-6
|- style="background:#cfc;"
| 21
| March 10
| L.A. Clippers
| W 94-75
| Shaquille O'Neal 31
| Shaquille O'Neal 13
| Bryant & Fox (4)
| Great Western Forum17,505
| 15-6
|- style="background:#cfc;"
| 22
| March 12
| Golden State
| W 89-78
| Glen Rice (21)
| Shaquille O'Neal (17)
| Fisher & Fox (5)
| Great Western Forum17,505
| 16-6
|- style="background:#fcc;"
| 23
| March 14
| @ Sacramento
| L 101-105
| Shaquille O'Neal (33)
| Shaquille O'Neal (11)
| Derek Fisher (7)
| ARCO Arena17,317
| 16-7
|- style="background:#cfc;"
| 24
| March 16
| @ Minnesota
| W 107-101
| Shaquille O'Neal (24)
| Kobe Bryant (9)
| Derek Harper (6)
| Target Center19,006
| 17-7
|- style="background:#fcc;"
| 25
| March 18
| @ Cleveland
| L 93-100
| Shaquille O'Neal (37)
| Shaquille O'Neal (19)
| Bryant & Rice (5)
| Gund Arena20,562
| 17-8
|- style="background:#fcc;"
| 26
| March 19
| @ Philadelphia
| L 90-105
| Bryant & O'Neal (23)
| Travis Knight (9)
| Harper & Rice (3)
| First Union Center20,644
| 17-9
|- style="background:#cfc;"
| 27
| March 21
| @ Orlando
| W 115-104
| Kobe Bryant (38)
| Shaquille O'Neal (13)
| Derek Fisher (8)
| Orlando Arena17,248
| 18-9
|- style="background:#cfc;"
| 28
| March 22
| @ Dallas
| W 96-93
| Shaquille O'Neal (25)
| Dennis Rodman (17)
| Fisher & Fox (4)
| Reunion Arena18,121
| 19-9
|- style="background:#fcc;"
| 29
| March 24
| Phoenix
| L 101-106
| Kobe Bryant (25)
| Dennis Rodman (13)
| Derek Harper (7)
| Great Western Forum17,505
| 19-10
|- style="background:#fcc;"
| 30
| March 26
| Sacramento
| L 109-111
| Kobe Bryant (26)
| Dennis Rodman (9)
| Bryant & Fisher (6)
| Great Western Forum17,505
| 19-11
|- style="background:#cfc;"
| 31
| March 28
| New York
| W 99-91
| Kobe Bryant (29)
| Dennis Rodman (12)
| Derek Harper (9)
| Great Western Forum17,505
| 20-11
|- style="background:#cfc;"
| 32
| March 29
| Vancouver
| W 116-98
| Shaquille O'Neal (26)
| Dennis Rodman (17)
| Harper & Rice (6)
| Great Western Forum17,312
| 21-11

|- style="background:#cfc;"
| 33
| April 2
| @ Phoenix
| W 91-90
| Glen Rice (23)
| Dennis Rodman (15)
| Derek Harper (10)
| American West Arena19,023
| 22-11
|- style="background:#fcc;"
| 34
| April 3
| Golden State
| L 76-81
| Shaquille O'Neal (21)
| Dennis Rodman (13)
| Glen Rice (5)
| Great Western Forum17,505
| 22-12
|- style="background:#cfc;"
| 35
| April 5
| Denver
| W 117-104
| Bryant & Rice (26)
| Dennis Rodman (17)
| Derek Harper (9)
| Great Western Forum17,505
| 23-12
|- style="background:#fcc;"
| 36
| April 6
| Utah
| L 93-106
| Shaquille O'Neal (24)
| Dennis Rodman (12)
| Tyronn Lue (6)
| Great Western Forum17,505
| 23-13
|- style="background:#cfc;"
| 37
| April 7
| @ Sacramento
| W 104-89
| Shaquille O'Neal (30)
| Shaquille O'Neal (18)
| Kobe Bryant (7)
| ARCO Arena17,317
| 24-13
|- style="background:#cfc;"
| 38
| April 9
| Minnesota
| W 96-89
| O'Neal & Rice (25)
| Shaquille O'Neal (15)
| Kobe Bryant (7)
| Great Western Forum17,505
| 25-13
|- style="background:#fcc;"
| 39
| April 11
| Seattle
| L 109-113
| Shaquille O'Neal (38)
| Dennis Rodman (13)
| Kobe Bryant (9)
| Great Western Forum17,505
| 25-14
|- style="background:#fcc;"
| 40
| April 13
| @ Portland
| L 86-113
| Shaquille O'Neal (24)
| Shaquille O'Neal (14)
| Derek Fisher (7)
| Rose Garden20,705
| 25-15
|- style="background:#fcc;"
| 41
| April 17
| @ Utah
| L 93-109
| Shaquille O'Neal (29)
| Shaquille O'Neal (14)
| Derek Fisher (6)
| Delta Center19,911
| 25-16
|- style="background:#cfc;"
| 42
| April 19
| Vancouver
| W 117-102
| Shaquille O'Neal (35)
| Robert Horry (12)
| Kobe Bryant (8)
| Great Western Forum17,505
| 26-16
|- style="background:#cfc;"
| 43
| April 20
| @ Golden State
| W 106-102 (OT)
| Kobe Bryant (27)
| Glen Rice (12)
| Kobe Bryant (5)
| The Arena in Oakland20,108
| 27-16
|- style="background:#fcc;"
| 44
| April 21
| @ Portland
| L 82-88
| Shaquille O'Neal (25)
| Shaquille O'Neal (13)
| Kobe Bryant (4)
| Rose Garden20,713
| 27-17
|- style="background:#fcc;"
| 45
| April 24
| @ San Antonio
| L 81-108
| Shaquille O'Neal (26)
| Shaquille O'Neal (12)
| Derek Fisher (6)
| Alamodome31,972
| 27-18
|- style="background:#fcc;"
| 46
| April 26
| @ Houston
| L 80-102
| Shaquille O'Neal (19)
| Shaquille O'Neal (12)
| Derek Fisher (7)
| Compaq Center16,285
| 27-19
|- style="background:#cfc;"
| 47
| April 29
| Portland
| W 108-89
| Shaquille O'Neal (38)
| Shaquille O'Neal (12)
| Kobe Bryant (7)
| Great Western Forum17,505
| 28-19

|- style="background:#cfc;"
| 48
| May 2
| @ Seattle
| W 91-84
| Shaquille O'Neal (33)
| Shaquille O'Neal (12)
| Derek Fisher (6)
| KeyArena17,072
| 29-19
|- style="background:#cfc;"
| 49
| May 3
| Dallas
| W 115-102
| Shaquille O'Neal (26)
| Shaquille O'Neal (11)
| Kobe Bryant (10)
| Great Western Forum17,505
| 30-19
|- style="background:#cfc;"
| 50
| May 5
| Portland
| W 119-91
| Glen Rice (40)
| Shaquille O'Neal (9)
| Derek Fisher (8)
| Great Western Forum17,505
| 31-19

Playoffs

|- style="background:#cfc;"
| 1
| May 9
| Houston
| W 101–100
| Glen Rice (29)
| Shaquille O'Neal (11)
| Derek Fisher (6)
| Great Western Forum17,505
| 1–0
|- style="background:#cfc;"
| 2
| May 11
| Houston
| W 110–98
| Shaquille O'Neal (28)
| Robert Horry (10)
| Shaquille O'Neal (7)
| Great Western Forum17,505
| 2–0
|- style="background:#fcc;"
| 3
| May 13
| @ Houston
| L 88–102
| Shaquille O'Neal (26)
| Shaquille O'Neal (10)
| Derek Fisher (6)
| Compaq Center16,285
| 2–1
|- style="background:#cfc;"
| 4
| May 15
| @ Houston
| W 98–88
| Shaquille O'Neal (37)
| Shaquille O'Neal (11)
| Kobe Bryant (8)
| Compaq Center16,285
| 3–1
|-

|- style="background:#fcc;"
| 1
| May 17
| @ San Antonio
| L 81–87
| 3 players tied (21)
| Shaquille O'Neal (15)
| Kobe Bryant (6)
| Alamodome25,297
| 0–1
|- style="background:#fcc;"
| 2
| May 19
| @ San Antonio
| L 76–79
| Kobe Bryant (28)
| 3 players tied (8)
| Kobe Bryant (4)
| Alamodome33,293
| 0–2
|- style="background:#fcc;"
| 3
| May 22
| San Antonio
| L 91–103
| Glen Rice (24)
| Shaquille O'Neal (15)
| Derek Fisher (9)
| Great Western Forum17,505
| 0–3
|- style="background:#fcc;"
| 4
| May 23
| San Antonio
| L 107–118
| Shaquille O'Neal (36)
| Shaquille O'Neal (14)
| Fisher & Lue (6)
| Great Western Forum17,505
| 0–4
|-

Player stats

Regular season 

 Shaquille O'Neal averaged 26.3 ppg (2nd), 10.7 rpg (8th), and shot 57.6% (1st). For his efforts, he was named to the All-NBA second-team.
 Kobe Bryant had a career high 19.9 ppg and added 3.8 apg. He was recognized as an All-NBA third-team.
 Dennis Rodman played 23 games with the Lakers in 1999. He averaged 11.2 rebounds per game and the Lakers went 17–6 with Rodman in the lineup.
 Glen Rice played in 27 games with the club and averaged 17.5 points per game. With Rice in the lineup, the Lakers went 16-11

Playoffs

Awards and honors
 Kobe Bryant, All-NBA Third Team
 Shaquille O'Neal, All-NBA Second Team

Transactions

References

 Lakers on Database Basketball
 Lakers on Basketball Reference
 http://sportsillustrated.cnn.com/basketball/nba/1999/playoffs/daily_schedule/

Los Angeles Lakers seasons
Los Angle
Los Angle
Los Angle